The 1876–77 Home Nations rugby union matches are a series of international friendlies held between the England, Ireland and Scotland national rugby union teams.

Results

Scoring system
The matches for this season were decided on goals scored. A goal was awarded for a successful conversion after a try, for a dropped goal or for a goal from mark. If a game was drawn, any unconverted tries were tallied to give a winner. If there was still no clear winner, the match was declared a draw.

Matches

England vs. Ireland

England: LH Birkett (Clapham Rovers), L Stokes (Blackheath F.C.), A. N. Hornby (Preston), Reg Birkett (Clapham Rovers), WC Hutchinson (I.C.E. College), PLA Price (I.C.E. College), Edward Kewley (Liverpool) capt., FR Adams (Richmond), RH Fowler (Leeds), Murray Marshall (Blackheath F.C.), G Harrison (Hull), WH Hunt (Preston), Charles Touzel (Cambridge University), FH Lee (Oxford University), Edward Beadon Turner (St. George's Hospital)

Ireland: RB Walkington (NIFC), R Galbraith (Dublin University) capt:, H Brown (Windsor), FW Kidd (Lansdowne), AM Whitestone (Dublin University), TG Gordon (NIFC), HW Jackson (Dublin University), HL Cox (Dublin University), W Finlay (NIFC), J Ireland (Windsor), WH Wilson (Dublin University), HG Edwards (Dublin University), HC Kelly (NIFC), T Brown (Windsor), WJ Hamilton (Dublin University)

Ireland vs. Scotland

Ireland: RGM Shaw, H Moore, RB Walkington, FW Kidd, J Heron, TG Gordon, J Correll, HL Cox, W Finlay, JA McDonald, WH Wilson capt:, HW Murray, HC Kelly, T Brown, WH Ash

Scotland: HH Johnston (Edinburgh University RFC), Malcolm Cross, RC MacKenzie, EI Pocock (Edinburgh Wanderers), JR Hay-Gordon, Stewart Henry Smith, DH Watson, D Lang, Charles Villar, RW Irvine capt., AG Petrie, JHS Graham, Henry Melville Napier, J Reid, JE Junor

Scotland vs. England

England: LH Birkett, L Stokes, A. N. Hornby, AW Pearson, WAD Evanson, PLA Price, Edward Kewley capt., HWT Garnett, R Todd, Murray Marshall, G Harrison (Hull), WH Hunt (Preston), Charles Touzel, CC Bryden, AF Law

Scotland: JS Carrick, HH Johnston (Edinburgh Collegiate RFC), Malcolm Cross, RC MacKenzie, EI Pocock (Edinburgh Wanderers), JR Hay-Gordon, DH Watson, TJ Torrie, Charles Villar, RW Irvine capt., AG Petrie, JHS Graham, Henry Melville Napier, J Reid, JE Junor

Bibliography

References

History of rugby union matches between England and Scotland
History of rugby union matches between England and Ireland
History of rugby union matches between Ireland and Scotland
England national rugby union team matches
Scotland national rugby union team matches
Ireland national rugby union team matches
1876–77 in British rugby union
1877 in English sport
1877 in Scottish sport
rugby union